Aponotoreas is a genus of moths in the family Geometridae erected by Robin C. Craw in 1986.

Species
 Aponotoreas anthracias (Meyrick, 1883)
 Aponotoreas dissimilis (Philpott, 1914)
 Aponotoreas incompta (Philpott, 1918)
 Aponotoreas insignis (Butler, 1877)
 Aponotoreas orphnaea (Meyrick, 1883)
 Aponotoreas synclinalis (Hudson, 1903)
 Aponotoreas villosa (Philpott, 1917)
 Aponotoreas cheimatobiata (Guenée, 1857)
 Aponotoreas dascia (Turner, 1904)
 Aponotoreas epicrossa (Meyrick, 1891)
 Aponotoreas petrodes (Turner, 1904)

References

Hydriomenini
Geometridae genera
Taxa named by Robin Craw